Feliz Navidad is a Christmas album by singer/songwriter José Feliciano. Originally titled José Feliciano and released in 1970 on vinyl record, 8-track tape & cassette Tape by RCA Victor, it was reissued on CD in 1989 by BMG Heritage with all the songs of the original album (Christmas classics and Feliciano's famous composition "Feliz Navidad") plus three original songs added and recorded by José but never released on the original vinyl album ("Las Posadas", "Santa Claus Is Coming To Town" and "O Come All Ye Faithful").

Each year at Christmas time, this CD is on the BMG music catalog, and the song "Feliz Navidad" has become one of the most downloaded and aired Christmas songs in the US, awarded by ASCAP as one of the top 25 Christmas songs most played and recorded around the world.

Track listing
"Feliz Navidad"
"Jingle Bells" (Instrumental)
"The Christmas Song"
"The First Noel" (Instrumental)
"The Cherry Tree Carol"
"The Little Drummer Boy"
"White Christmas" (Instrumental)
"We Three Kings Of Orient Are" (Instrumental)
"Mary's Little Boy Child"
"It Came Upon a Midnight Clear" (Instrumental)
"Silent Night"
"Hark, The Herald Angels Sing" (Instrumental)
Bonus Tracks 2002 edition:
"Las Posadas"
"Santa Claus Is Coming to Town" (Instrumental)
"O Come All Ye Faithful" (Instrumental)

Charts

References

José Feliciano albums
RCA Records Christmas albums
RCA Victor albums
1970 Christmas albums
Christmas albums by Puerto Rican artists
Spanish-language albums
Albums arranged by Perry Botkin Jr.
Albums produced by Rick Jarrard
Pop Christmas albums